Swoop were an Australian seven-piece rock, funk and disco band established in 1991 by mainstays by Joshua Beagley on guitar and keyboards and Roland Kapferer on lead vocals (rapping, MCing). They released three studio albums, Thriller (October 1993), The Woxo Principle (November 1995) and Be What You Is (January 1999). Their most popular single, "Apple Eyes" (1995), reached No. 9 in Australia on the ARIA singles chart, and was certified gold by ARIA.

History

1991–1993: Thriller 

Swoop were an Australian seven-piece rock, funk and disco band established in 1991 in Sydney as a funk and rap duo by Joshua Beagley on guitar and keyboards and Roland Kapferer on lead vocals (rapping, MCing). The pair had met as students at Marryatville High School, Adelaide in 1987 before relocating to Sydney. The duo were joined by "an ever-changing line-up that has featured a collection of rappers, DJs, musos and dancers". The band released two early singles "Positivity's Groove" (May 1992) and "Jelly Funk" (August). Fiona Ta'akimoeaka joined Swoop on lead vocals before August 1992 and by November the other members of the seven-piece were Chris Brien on drums, Armando Gomez on percussion, Alex 'Gob' Hewetson on bass guitar and Breadman St Ledger III on keyboards.

For their third single "Everybody Loves the Sunshine", which appeared in November 1992, they were briefly joined by Terepai Richmond (also a member of Directions In Groove) on percussion. Rebecca Lang of The Canberra Times described their sound, "Drawing on the '70s funk, dipping into '90s acid jazz and adding a blend of '80s rap." In August 1993 the group issued "Do It", which became a disco hit in Japan; it was also listed at No. 87 on national radio station Triple J's popularity poll, Triple J Hottest 100, 1993. It was followed with their debut studio album, Thriller via Freakzone Records/MGM Distribution in October. Beagley recalled "we released [it] on our own label purely through frustration of not being able to get a deal. The end result was a deal so it was worth all the pain."

1994–1999: The Woxo Principle and Be What You Is

In October 1994 Swoop released "Neighbourhood Freak", which became the group's first charting single, peaking at No. 62 on the ARIA singles chart. That track appeared at No.74 on Triple J Hottest 100, 1994. At the ARIA Music Awards of 1994 they were nominated for Best New Talent for Thriller. During 1994 and 1995 the group played regular gigs in the Gershwin Room at St Kilda's Esplanade Hotel. The group released "Rock Dog" in July 1995 and followed in October with "Apple Eyes", which peaked at No. 9 on the ARIA Charts and was certified gold by ARIA in the following year for shipment of 35000 copies. "Apple Eyes" was listed at No. 32 on Triple J Hottest 100, 1995.

In November 1995 Swoop released their second studio album The Woxo Principle via Mushroom Records/Festival Records. It reached No. 51 on the ARIA albums chart. The Canberra Times Liz Armitage felt, "it does embrace the spontaneity and spirit that makes a really good band. Lyrically, Swoop has always been dodgy... and this shows no sign of changing." Simon Woodridge of Juice Magazine observed, they "contrived a cheesy amalgam of funk/rock/disco/pop on [this album], and they've put it together with enough skill to make overlooking the amount of second hand riffage totally painless." Two further singles were released from the album, including their cover version of Captain & Tennille's "Do That to Me (One More Time)" (September 1996). At the ARIA Music Awards of 1996 they were nominated for Song of the Year and Best Video for "Apple Eyes", and Best Pop Release for The Woxo Principle.

The group took a six-month break from touring and performing while Kapferer finished his PhD. During that break Ta'akimoeaka left the band in 1996 and was replaced by Rebekah Jane (later known as Rebekah LaVauney) as lead vocalist in 1997. Brien was replaced by American-born Allen Murphey. By 1998 latter-day members included drummer Calvin Welch and Japanese-born keyboard player Tetsushi Morita.

Swoop issued "Blood Runs Hot" (May 1998), the lead single from their third studio album Be What You Is, which was released in January 1999. Also in that month they provided "Remedy". The group performed "Angel Eyes" at Mushroom 25 Concert in November 1998 and disbanded thereafter.

2000–present: After Swoop

After Swoop, Beagley, Kapferer and Welch formed Professor Groove & the Booty Affair with Sam Dixon on bass guitar and Robert Woolf on keyboards and vocals (later replaced by Richard Stanford on keyboards). They released their debut album, And so Funketh the Wise Man in 2001.

Rebekah Jane as Rebekah LaVauney reached the top 8 on Australian Idol in 2003 and issued an EP, Chapter 1 in 2005. Brien became a live and recording session musician, drum clinician and teacher; in November 2006 he relocated to Hong Kong.

Members 

 Joshua Beagley – electric, acoustic guitars 
 Roland Kapferer – lead vocals (rap) 
 Fiona Ta'akimoeaka – lead vocals 
 Chris Brien – drums, bells, tambourine, voices 
 Armando Gomez – wood block
 Alex Hewetson – bass guitar
 Breadman St Ledger – piano, electric pianos, organ, [[clavinet), synthesisers, xylophone, mellotron, talk box
 Terepai Richmond – percussion 
 Rebekah Jane  Rebekah LaVauney – lead vocals 
 Allen Murphey – drums 
 Tetsushi Morita – keyboards 
 Calvin Welch – drums

Discography

Studio albums

Compilation album

Extended play

Singles

Awards and nominations

ARIA Music Awards
The ARIA Music Awards is an annual awards ceremony that recognises excellence, innovation, and achievement across all genres of Australian music. They commenced in 1987.

|
|-
| 1994
| Thriller
| ARIA Award for Best New Talent
| 
|
|-
|rowspan="3"| 1996
| The Woxo Principle
| ARIA Award for Best Pop Release
| 
|rowspan="3"|
|-
| "Apple Eyes"
| ARIA Award for Song of the Year
| 
|-
| John Fransic for Swoop – "Apple Eyes"
| ARIA Award for Best Video
| 
|-

References

Australian rock music groups
Australian funk musical groups
Musical groups established in 1991
Musical groups disestablished in 1999
Musical groups from Sydney